My Girlfriend's Ghost (Spanish: El fantasma de mi novia) is a 2018 Dominican fantasy romantic comedy film directed by Francis Disla,  and stars Carmen Villalobos, and William Levy. The film premiered on May 3, 2018.

Plot 
The film revolves around Lupe del Mar, an impertinent and arrogant actress of Mexican telenovelas, who travels to Dominican Republic to make one of her greatest dreams come true, to record a film. She suffers a terrible accident, which leads her to be in a coma and experience fun situations.

Cast 
 Carmen Villalobos as Lupe del Mar
 William Levy as Chepa
 Fausto Mata as Juglar Elías Delmonte Carmelo
 Susana Dosamantes as Abuela María
 Brandon Peniche as Fernando Hurtado
 Francisca Lachapel as Deborah Pinales
 Elizabeth Gutiérrez as Elena

References

External links 
 

2018 films
2018 fantasy films

2018 romantic comedy films
Dominican Republic fantasy films
Dominican Republic romantic comedy films
2010s Spanish-language films